The Union of International Mountain Leader Associations (UIMLA) was founded in November 2004. It was decided at the meeting that all mountain leader associations would be awarded the same carnet and badge giving an internationally recognised identity. It also paves the way for other countries from around the world to join UIMLA setting a world standard for mountain leaders. 
The principal aims of UIMLA are:
 To promote the profession of International Mountain Leader (IML) and to reinforce its identity beyond Europe;
 To develop relationships between the professionals of various nationalities and to take part in the evolution of the IML training and qualifications;
 To represent the profession at a European and international level.

The UIMLA International Mountain Leader and the IFMGA Mountain Guide are the only internationally recognised qualifications for those leading groups in the mountains.

The International Mountain Leader Award is the professional qualification for individuals who wish to lead trekking parties to all mountain areas, summer and winter, where the techniques or equipment of alpinism are not required. On successful completion of the full training and assessment programme, and by belonging to their recognised National Body, the individual will gain the full IML Award, a professional Carnet and Internationally recognised badge, giving them comparability with other IMLs worldwide.

UIMLA is a member of the International Climbing and Mountaineering Federation (UIAA) and the International Commission for Alpine Rescue

UIMLA is officially based in Switzerland in the commune of Villars-sur-Ollon in the canton of the Vaud.

See also 
 BAIML
 British Association of Mountain Guides
 IFMGA

Member associations 
 Andorra: L´Associació de Guies i Acompanyants de Muntanya d´Andorra(AGAMA)
 Argentina : Asociación Argentina de Guías de Montaña
 Belgium: Union Professionnelle des Métiers de la Montagne (UPMM)
 Bulgaria: Mountains & people association
Croatia: Savez gorskih vodiča Hrvatske
 Czech Republic: Czech mountain leader association (CZIML)
 France: Syndicat National des Accompagnateurs en Montagne (LESAEM)
 Germany: Verband Deutscher Berg.- u. Skiführer 
 Italy: Associazione Italiana Mountain Leaders (AIML)
Japan: Japan Mountain Guides Association 
 Netherlands: Nederlandse Associatie van International Mountain Leaders (NLAIML) 
Peru: Asociación de Guías Oficiales de Caminata del Perú
 Poland: Stowarzyszenie Międzynarodowych Przewodników Górskich "LIDER’ (SMPG)
Republic of North Macedonia - Macedonian association of International Mountain Guides
 Romania: Societatea Ghizilor Liberilor Montani
Slovenia - Združenje planinskih vodnikov Slovenije
Slovakia - Slovenská asociácia horských sprievodcov
 Spain: Asociación Española de Guías de Montaña (AEGM)
 Switzerland: Association Suisse des Accompagnateurs en Montagne (ASAM)
 United Kingdom: British Association of International Mountain Leaders (BAIML)

References 
 European Mountain Leader Commission, (1992). Community Standard for Conditions of Access to and Practice of the Profession of European Mountain Leader: UK Mountain Leader Training Board, Capel Curig, Wales.
 Mountain Leader Training UK, (2007). International Mountain Leader Handbook: Mountain Leader Training UK, Capel Curig, Wales.
 UIAA Youth Commission, (2001) Seminar on Youth Leader Education for Mountaineering 7–10 October 2001 UIAA Switzerland. Downloaded from  16 June 2007.

External links 
 Union of International Mountain Leader Associations website
 International Mountain Leader Award details (MTUK website)
 UIAGM / IVBV / IFMGA official website
 Official International Mountain Leader Award Handbook

Mountain guides associations
Supraorganizations